The sport of football in the country of South Sudan is run by the South Sudan Football Association. The association administers the national football team, as well as the Football Championship. Football is the most popular sport in South Sudan.

South Sudan national football stadium

References